Edward Gerard Murphy (July 1, 1941 – February 16, 2020) was an American college basketball coach.  He was head coach of the Ole Miss Rebels team from 1986 to 1992.  He was also the head coach at the University of West Georgia from 1993 to 2007.

Murphy died on February 16, 2020, at age 78.

References

https://mississippitoday.org/2020/02/19/the-son-of-a-syracuse-street-cop-ed-murphy-left-an-indelible-mark-on-mississippi/

1941 births
2020 deaths
American men's basketball coaches
American men's basketball players
Delta State Statesmen basketball coaches
Hardin–Simmons Cowboys basketball players
High school basketball coaches in the United States
New Mexico State Aggies men's basketball coaches
Ole Miss Rebels men's basketball coaches
West Alabama Tigers men's basketball coaches
West Georgia Wolves men's basketball coaches
Wichita State Shockers men's basketball coaches